was a Japanese businessman and founder of the petroleum company Idemitsu Kosan. He was also an art collector, especially fond of Sengai Gibon. He is the father of the Japanese experimental video artist, Mako Idemitsu.

See also 
 Idemitsu Kosan
 Idemitsu Museum of Arts

References 

20th-century Japanese businesspeople
Businesspeople in the oil industry
Japanese philanthropists
Museum founders
Japanese art collectors
People from Fukuoka Prefecture
1885 births
1981 deaths
Kobe University alumni